Sir Richard Geoffrey James Ottaway (born 24 May 1945) is a British Conservative Party politician who served as the Member of Parliament for Croydon South from 1992 to 2015. He was previously MP for Nottingham North from 1983 to 1987.

Early life
Ottaway was born in Sonning, Berkshire. He attended Backwell School, a secondary modern in Backwell, North Somerset, and joined the Britannia Royal Naval College in Dartmouth before serving as a Royal Navy officer in 1961-70 as a Lieutenant.

Ottaway studied law at Bristol University, graduating in 1974. He qualified as a solicitor in 1977, specialising in maritime and commercial law, and was a partner of William A. Crump & Son in London in 1981–87. He was a director of Coastal States Petroleum (UK) Ltd in 1988–95.

Parliamentary career
Ottaway was MP for Nottingham North from 1983 to 1987. This was a long-standing Labour Party seat, and he won it unexpectedly with a majority of 362 in the landslide victory following the Falklands War. Unsurprisingly the seat reverted to Labour in 1987, when he was defeated by Graham Allen. Ottaway re-entered Parliament in 1992 when he won Croydon South.

In 1992-95 Ottaway was Parliamentary Private Secretary to Michael Heseltine MP and from October 1995 he was a Government Whip. In opposition until 2005, he was a Front Bench spokesman as Shadow Minister for London and Local Government, Shadow Defence Minister, Shadow Paymaster General and Shadow Secretary of State for the Environment.

In the 2005–2010 Parliament he was a member of the Intelligence and Security Committee, Vice Chairman of the 1922 Committee and a member of the Conservative Party Board. After the 2010 election he became the first Chairman of the Foreign Affairs Select Committee to be elected by MPs from all sides of the House.

In 2011 he was declared The Week's "Backbencher of the Year" based on an enquiry into Afghanistan that was highly critical of Government policy and urged the UK to do more to encourage the US to talk with the Taliban.

Ottaway chaired the All Party Parliamentary London 2012 Olympic and Paralympic Group and is a member of the All Party Parliamentary Group for Population, Development and Reproductive Health. In 2012 he won the Population Institute's Global Media Award for ground-breaking research into population growth. His Sex, Ideology and Religion: 10 Myths about world population won the Best Essay category.

As a long-standing campaigner for the right of terminally-ill people to die at home, Ottaway tabled a historic backbench committee debate on assisted suicide in the House of Commons in March 2012. This resulted in Parliament agreeing for the first time that it is not in the public interest to prosecute people who compassionately help a loved one to die. However, assisting suicide is still illegal and the issue is controversial. He subsequently made the case for assisted dying – suicide with the help of medical professionals. In October 2012 he debated at the Oxford Union in favour of the motion: This House Would Legalise Assisted Dying, and won by 167 to 131 votes.

In October 2012, Ottaway announced his decision not to stand in 2015 at a meeting of his local party. He was appointed to the Privy Council in October 2013. On 12 November 2013, Chris Philp was selected to become the next Conservative parliamentary candidate for Croydon South.

Ottaway was knighted in the 2014 New Year Honours for parliamentary and political service.

Foreign Affairs Select Committee
After the 2010 General Election Ottaway was elected the Chairman of the House of Commons Select Committee on Foreign Affairs. He presided over inquiries including an annual look at the Foreign and Commonwealth Office's Human Rights work, the UK's relations with Saudi Arabia and Bahrain, foreign policy implications of and for a separate Scotland, and the future of the EU. He raised through correspondence with Foreign Secretary William Hague concerns about the legality of arming rebels in Syria.

Ottaway voted for the Iraq War based on evidence presented to Parliament, but subsequently regretted his decision as he believes that the British public were not told the truth. Ottaway was a member of the Foreign Affairs Committee in 2003 when the committee took evidence from David Kelly, the former UN weapons inspector who revealed details of the dossier on weapons of mass destruction in Iraq. His question to Prime Minister Tony Blair on 4 February 2003 revealed that Blair had not appreciated that Iraq possessed only defensive battlefield or small-calibre weaponry rather than long-range weapons of mass destruction when he made his speech in the Iraq debate that led to the House of Commons voting in favour of war. Ottaway asserted that if that information had been spelled out to MPs “those weapons might not have been described as weapons of mass destruction threatening the region and the stability of the world”. He is currently leading an inquiry on the UK's relation with Hong Kong, a former British colony, 30 years after the Joint Declaration amid series pro-democracy protests.

Europe
Ottaway is a founding member of the European Mainstream Group, formed in February 2013 to articulate a positive Conservative attitude to Europe as set out by David Cameron in his Bloomberg Speech.

As Chairman of the Foreign Affairs Committee, Ottaway presided over an inquiry into the Future of the EU and has pledged his support for the EU Referendum Bill. On 15 May 2013 he made the economic case for staying in the EU in the Queen’s Speech debate on economic growth. He answered his main opponent on the day in an article in ConservativeHome.

Scrap Metal Dealers Act 2013
In 2013, Ottaway celebrated the passing of his Private Member’s Bill to crack down on metal theft and the desecration of war memorials by tighter regulation of scrap metal yards, car breakers and anyone buying, selling and trading in scrap metal. Ottoway worked closely with the Home Office, Chief Constable Paul Crowther and Superintendent John McBride to bring about change.  His interest in metal theft dated back to 2009, when thieves stole lead from a constituency parish church, causing tens of thousands of pounds worth damage to the building and the historic organ when rainwater trickled through.

The Bill won overwhelming support in both Houses as well as from the Government. It was backed by organisations including The Royal British Legion, War Memorials Trust, Church of England, Network Rail, BT, the Energy Networks Association, the Institute of Directors, the Federation of Small Businesses, Arts Council England, Tate Galleries, the Henry Moore Foundation, the Local Government Association, British Transport Police and the British Metals Recycling Association. It received Royal Assent on 28 February 2013 and was implemented on 1 October 2013, in time for the centenary of the outbreak of the First World War.

2009 expenses scandal
During the Daily Telegraph expenses scandal it was revealed that Ottaway claimed for a second home nine miles south of the constituency, with another house minutes from Parliament. Ottaway apologised to constituents for his part in 'allowing an indefensible system of allowances to develop' and announced he would let Croydon South party members decide his fate in a vote of confidence. The local association's President, Lord Bowness, chaired the meeting, which ended in a secret ballot that Ottaway won.

Among his expenses claims between April 2004 and March 2008 were £59.99 on light bulbs and £48 for modifying a scarifier. He paid back £2,025 that he had claimed as half of the price of an orthopaedic bed and £1,400 for homeware and electrical goods. David Cameron's Conservative head office scrutiny panel did not ask him to pay back any more.

2014 incident with constituents

It was reported that Ottaway called the police for 'security' when a group of constituents – most of whom were of pension age – visited his office to hand in a petition against the 'Gagging Law' (Transparency of Lobbying, non-Party Campaigning, and Trade Union Administration Bill) on 17 January 2014. A Metropolitan Police spokesman said: "Officers spoke to all parties. No offences were identified and the officers left." Ottaway, however, was reported as saying that he would do the same again.

Personal life
Ottaway married Nicky, a magistrate and former international television production executive, in 1982. His main leisure interests are jazz and sailing. He is an active member of the All Party Parliamentary Jazz Appreciation Group. He is also an enthusiastic amateur yachtsman, competing in the Daring keelboat class.

He is the nephew of the actor James Ottaway.

References

External links
 Richard Ottaway MP Official site
 
 ePolitix.com - Richard Ottaway MP
 Guardian Unlimited Politics - Ask Aristotle: Richard Ottaway MP
 TheyWorkForYou.com - Richard Ottaway MP
 The Public Whip - Richard Ottaway MP voting record
 BBC News - Richard Ottaway  profile BBC News, 16 March 2006

|-

|-

|-

1945 births
Alumni of the University of Bristol
Conservative Party (UK) MPs for English constituencies
English solicitors
Graduates of Britannia Royal Naval College
Knights Bachelor
Living people
Members of the Privy Council of the United Kingdom
People from Backwell
People from Sonning
Politics of the London Borough of Croydon
Royal Navy officers
UK MPs 1983–1987
UK MPs 1992–1997
UK MPs 1997–2001
UK MPs 2001–2005
UK MPs 2005–2010
UK MPs 2010–2015
Politicians awarded knighthoods